Myron Gordon may refer to:
Myron Gordon (biologist) (1899–1959), American ichthyologist
Myron J. Gordon (1920–2010), American economist
Myron L. Gordon (1918–2009), U.S. federal judge